Femi Emmanuel Balogun (born 27 December 1992) is a Nigerian footballer who plays as a left winger for Portuguese club C.D. Cova da Piedade.

Career

Atlético Baleares 

Balogun began his professional career at Kaduna United, and few years later, he joined Atlético Baleares of Spain in 2012/2013 season.

S.C. Olhanense 
Femi Balogun moved to S.C. Olhanense in 2013/2014 season, he scored his first league goal against S.L. Benfica in Portugal first Division match on 15 December 2013.

In 2014/2015 season with S.C. Olhanense he provided much assist in goals scored for the team with his fast attacking moves, he is known with his tricks and speed on defenders.

Ermis Aradippou 
In August 2015 Balogun joined Ermis Aradippou in Cyprus First Division for the 2015/2016 season, later in January 2016 he moved to S.C. Farense in second Division Portugal League on loan till end of the 2015/2016 season.

Desportivo das Aves 
In May 2016 Femi Balogun signed for Desportivo das Aves Portugal League second Division for 2016/2017 season, Desportivo das Aves was promoted to Liga one after a successful 2016/2017 season.

C.F. Os Belenenses 
In June 2017 Femi Balogun signed a two-year-contract for C.F. Os Belenenses.

Académica de Coimbra – O.A.F. 
In August 2017 Femi Balogun moved to Académica on loan till end of the season, on his debut for Academica scored a goal.

Honours

Club 
Kaduna United
 Nigerian FA Cup (1): 2010

References

External links 
 

1992 births
Living people
Sportspeople from Kaduna
Nigerian footballers
Association football midfielders
Kaduna United F.C. players
Segunda División B players
CD Atlético Baleares footballers
Primeira Liga players
S.C. Olhanense players
Associação Académica de Coimbra – O.A.F. players
C.D. Cova da Piedade players
Cypriot First Division players
Ermis Aradippou FC players
Nigerian expatriate footballers
Expatriate footballers in Spain
Nigerian expatriate sportspeople in Spain
Expatriate footballers in Portugal
Nigerian expatriate sportspeople in Portugal
Expatriate footballers in Cyprus